Snæfell men's basketball, commonly known as Snæfell, is the men's basketball department of Ungmennafélagið Snæfell, based in Stykkishólmur, Iceland.

History
Snæfell won its first and only national championship in 2010, when it defeated Keflavík in the Úrvalsdeild karla finals. It won the Icelandic Basketball Cup in 2008 and 2010. On 27 September 2020, Snæfell withdrew its men's team from competition due to lack of players and financial difficulties.

Honors
 Úrvalsdeild karla (1):
2010
Runners-up (3): 2004, 2005, 2008
 Icelandic Basketball Cup (2):
2008, 2010
Runners-up (2): 1993, 2003
 Icelandic Basketball Supercup (1):
2010
 Company Cup (3):
2004, 2007, 2010
 1. deild karla (4):
1974, 1978, 1990, 1998

European record

Notable players

Coaches
 Bárður Eyþórsson
 Ívar Ásgrímsson
 Geof Kotila 
 Hlynur Bæringsson and Sigurður Þorvaldsson 
 Ingi Þór Steinþórsson 
 Vlaldimir Ivankovic 
 Baldur Þorleifsson and Jón Þór Eyþórsson 
 Benjamin Young Kil 
 Halldór Steingrímsson

References

External links
Official Website  
Eurobasket men's team profile
KKÍ: Stjarnan (men's) – kki.is  

Snæfell (basketball)